Pittsburgh Beadling is an amateur American soccer team founded in 1898 in the Pittsburgh suburb of Upper St. Clair, Pennsylvania.  It won the 1954 National Amateur Cup. It claims to be the oldest continuously operating soccer club in the United States.

History
Founded in 1898, Pittsburgh Beadling was formed by immigrant miners from Europe.  In 1911, the team enter the Pittsburgh Press League, commonly known as the Miners League, after having spent its first thirteen years as an independent recreational team.  In 1913, it won its first league title.  Three years later, it went to its first West Penn Cup where it finished runner up to Homestead Steel Works.  In 1919, it won its first West Penn Cup.  The team later entered the Keystone League.  In 1973, the National Soccer Hall of Fame inducted Joseph Delach, coach of Beadling.  At some point, the club began fielding two teams, the RD and the Blues.  In 1984, the club added youth teams.

Honors
West Penn Cup
 Winner: 1919
 Runner Up: 1916

National Amateur Cup
 Winner: 1954
 Runner Up: 1958

References

External links
 History of Beadling - A Tradition of Champions

Association football clubs established in 1898
Soccer clubs in Pittsburgh
1898 establishments in Pennsylvania